Irene Johansen (born 7 January 1961 in Nord-Aurdal) is a Norwegian politician for the Labour Party.

She was elected to the Norwegian Parliament from Østfold in 2005.

On the local level she was a deputy member of the executive committee of Moss municipal council from 2003 to 2007. She chairs the local party chapter since 2002.
 
Outside politics she has worked as a secretary in Seljord municipality, as a consultant in NAVF and Østfold county municipality and as personal director in the Norwegian National Rail Administration.

References

1961 births
Living people
Labour Party (Norway) politicians
Members of the Storting
Østfold politicians
People from Moss, Norway
Women members of the Storting
21st-century Norwegian politicians
21st-century Norwegian women politicians
People from Nord-Aurdal